The 2017 Toyota/Save Mart 350 was a Monster Energy NASCAR Cup Series race held on June 25, 2017, at Sonoma Raceway in Sonoma, California. Contested over 110 laps on the  road course, it was the 16th race of the 2017 Monster Energy NASCAR Cup Series season.

Report

Background

Sonoma Raceway, formerly Sears Point Raceway and Infineon Raceway is a  road course and drag strip located on the landform known as Sears Point in the southern Sonoma Mountains in Sonoma, California, USA. It is host to one of only two NASCAR Sprint Cup Series races each year that are run on road courses (the other being Watkins Glen International in Watkins Glen, New York). It is also host to the Verizon IndyCar Series and several other auto races and motorcycle races such as the American Federation of Motorcyclists series. Sonoma Raceway continues to host amateur, or club racing events which may or may not be open to the general public. The largest such car club is the Sports Car Club of America.

Entry list

Practice

First practice

Final practice

Qualifying

Qualifying results

Race

First stage
Kyle Larson led the field to the green flag at 3:22 p.m. With Sonoma Raceway being a more technical (rhythm) road course, brake usage is rather heavy, especially going into the 90° hairpin Turn 11. A few drivers locked up the brakes going into the turn in the early laps, including Daniel Suárez, who was making his first ever start at Sonoma. He flat-spotted his tires on the second lap and made an unscheduled stop the following lap to replace them. Two laps later, teammate Kyle Busch did the same. By the ninth lap, Martin Truex Jr. caught Larson and set him up for a pass heading into Turn 11 to take the race lead. Caution flew for the first time on lap 14 when Dale Earnhardt Jr. locked up his brakes and his car spun counter-clockwise, sending him through the hairpin and into the path of cars ahead, causing slight damage to Danica Patrick. Larson also suffered minor damage when he clipped Earnhardt. Chris Buescher took over the race lead because he opted not to pit under the caution.

The race restarted on lap 17 and Buescher led for another lap before teammate A. J. Allmendinger, on fresher tires, out-braked him going into Turn 10 to take the lead. Truex worked his way up to him, passed him entering Turn 11 to retake the lead and drove on to win the first stage on lap 25. Caution flew moments later for the completion of the stage.

Second stage
A lap after the ensuing restart on lap 30, Patrick (outside), Earnhardt (middle) and Larson (inside) tried to round Turn 4a three-wide, sending Earnhardt into the right-rear corner of Patrick and spinning her out into the path of Ricky Stenhouse Jr., who t-boned the drivers-side of her car. This brought out the third caution.

The race resumed on lap 33. Going into Turn 11 on the same lap, Allmendinger was clipped by Larson and spun in the hairpin. He was clipped by Clint Bowyer, but the race remained green. A caution did fly five laps later, however, for a piece of sheet metal in Turn 11.

Returning to green on lap 40, a number of cars – including race leader Truex – opted to short-pit the end of the second stage to set them up for the end of the race and because they didn't pit under the first stage break. This handed the race lead to Jimmie Johnson, who drove on to win the second stage. Caution flew moments later for the completion of the stage. Denny Hamlin assumed the race lead by electing not to pit.

Final stage

The race restarted with 56 laps to go. With 47 to go, Busch took advantage of Hamlin's slip into Turn 11 to take the lead, only to allow Kevin Harvick to pass him unchallenged on the frontstretch two laps later. With 43 to go, Truex caught Harvick and out-braked him entering Turn 11 to retake the lead. On the following lap, cars were hitting pit road to make their final stop of the race. Truex did so with 40 to go, and a slow stop shuffled him behind Harvick in the running order. Jamie McMurray assumed the lead with 39 to go before pitting the next time around, handing the lead to Brad Keselowski, who was hoping for a caution.

Shortly after his slow stop, Truex reported he was losing a cylinder (engine was failing). He was fading at first, but then reported the problem had subsided. He worked his way up to third before making an unscheduled stop with 24 to go and subsequently to the garage for an engine failure.

With 24 to go, Harvick had closed the gap to Keselowski to 1.3 seconds. Two laps later, Harvick made the race-winning pass on Keselowski rounding Turn 7a and set sail. On the final lap, Kasey Kahne slammed the barriers on the frontstretch as Harvick was coming to the line. This ended the race under caution and Harvick, who had a nine-second lead over second-place Bowyer, drove on to victory.

Race results

Stage results

Stage 1
Laps: 25

Stage 2
Laps: 25

Final stage results

Stage 3
Laps: 60

Race statistics
 Lead changes: 10 among different drivers
 Cautions/Laps: 6 for 12
 Red flags: 0
 Time of race: 2 hours, 46 minutes and 52 seconds
 Average speed:

Media

Television
Fox NASCAR televised the race in the United States on FS1 for the third consecutive year. Mike Joy was the lap-by-lap announcer, while six-time Sonoma winner Jeff Gordon and Darrell Waltrip were the color commentators. Jamie Little, Chris Neville and Matt Yocum reported from pit lane during the race.

Radio 
Radio coverage of the race was broadcast by Performance Racing Network. PRN's broadcast of the race was simulcasted on Sirius XM NASCAR Radio. Doug Rice and Mark Garrow announced the race in the booth while the field was racing on the pit straight. Pat Patterson called the race from a stand outside of turn 2 when the field was racing up turns 2, 3 and 3a. Brad Gillie called the race from a stand outside of turn 7a when the field was racing through turns 4a and 7a. The field came back into the view of the booth in turns 8 and 9. Rob Albright called the race from a billboard outside turn 11 when the field was racing through turns 10 and 11. Jeff Hammond, Brett McMillan, Jim Noble and Wendy Venturini reported from pit lane during the race.

Standings after the race

Drivers' Championship standings

Manufacturers' Championship standings

Note: Only the first 16 positions are included for the driver standings.
. – Driver has clinched a position in the Monster Energy NASCAR Cup Series playoffs.

References

Toyota Save Mart 350
Toyota Save Mart 350
Toyota Save Mart 350
NASCAR races at Sonoma Raceway